The British Rail Class 41 diesel-hydraulic locomotives were built by the North British Locomotive Company in Glasgow during 1957 and 1958. Although they were withdrawn before TOPS was introduced, British Rail classified them as Class 41. All were named after Royal Navy vessels, hence the nameplates each bore a subtitle "Warship Class".

History
The fleet was ordered by the British Transport Commission as direct comparison with the British Rail Class 40, and were not actually wanted by the Western Region, who preferred their production fleet of D800 Warships. The D600s were the result of power politics within the BTC and the WR: the former was unwilling to sanction radical, stressed-skin lightweight construction locomotives at the time, while the latter was equally insistent that at least some of the new Type 4 power range locomotives on order be equipped with hydraulic transmission. They were much heavier than production Warships (almost  compared to ) and can be regarded as standard 1950s British design diesel locomotives that just happened to contain two lightweight, high-revving diesel engines coupled to hydraulic transmissions rather than one large, slow-revving diesel engine and electrical generator set. For this reason they were practically obsolete in design terms before they had left the drawing board.

Mechanical details
Each locomotive was equipped with two MAN L12V18/21A diesel engines, each set to produce 1,000 hp (750 kW) at 1,445 rpm.  This conservative rating was partly because NBL was very inexperienced at constructing diesel locomotives and partly because the Voith L306r three speed transmissions available at the time were not able to accept more. MAN had refined the engine design to produce  at around the time the D600 order was placed with NBL. The A1A-A1A wheel arrangement likewise came about because the BTC-mandated heavyweight construction required 6 axles to keep to a 20-ton axle loading, but NBL could not work out how to create a pivotless bogie and driving arrangement for C-C wheel arrangement. There were no C-C diesel-hydraulic locomotives to use as a template in mid-1955. The arrangement produced a continuous tractive effort of 39,600 lbf (176 kN) at 12.6 mph (20.3 km/h). Unusually for a British diesel locomotive, the D600s had spoked wheels. They could work in multiple with each other or up to two D6300 locomotives using the orange square coupling code.

Service and liveries

D600 was officially completed on 25 November 1957 but was not handed over to BR until that December. Some trial runs with passenger coaches were done in south-west Scotland before D600 was allocated to Swindon in January 1958. A press run was arranged for 17 February 1958 when D600 hauled a 340-ton train between London Paddington and Bristol Temple Meads with stops at Reading, Didcot and Swindon.

D601 appeared in March 1958 and was also initially allocated to Swindon. By June 1958, both were based at Plymouth Laira and D602-D604 were then allocated there from new. The allocation of all five locomotives in July 1967 was Laira.

Entering service between January 1958 and January 1959, the class initially worked on the London-Plymouth-Penzance route of the Western Region. On 16 June 1958 D601 hauled the Cornish Riviera Express non-stop from Paddington to Plymouth—the first diesel locomotive to do so.  The maximum permitted loads for a D600 on such a run were 375 tons (381 tonnes) westbound (climbing the 1-in-37 of Dainton Bank, west of Newton Abbot, and up Hemerdon Bank's 1-in-42 in the opposite direction). The D600s continued on the fast Bristol/West of England trains until a dozen D800 Warships had been accepted into service. Later they were largely restricted to the line west of Plymouth, finally being withdrawn en bloc in December 1967. They were noted for being capable of over  if worked well and did run at 100 mph (160 km/h) during their very early careers. D603 was damaged in an accident and was returned to NBL for repair in 1960: the cast light alloy cabs were replaced with sheet steel as the original NBL subcontractor for these items was not prepared to fabricate a small, one-off order. Swindon had a spare cab which was not used and survived long after the locos had been withdrawn before finally being sold for scrap.

From new the D600s wore standard BR green with a  light grey horizontal band between the cabs a few inches above the solebar. By the time of withdrawal D600 was in all-over rail blue with full yellow ends, D602 was blue with small yellow warning panels on each nose and D601/3/4 were still green, albeit with yellow warning panels.

Withdrawal and scrapping
All five locomotives were withdrawn on 30 December 1967. By this time they were non-standard, even for hydraulic designs, although according to Laira staff reliability was not a problem as many have thought. BR had been ordered to reduce the number of main line locomotive classes from 28 to 15 by 1974, primarily by eliminating types which were known to be unreliable, had high maintenance costs or were so few in number as to be non-standard. As the table below shows, there was a substantial gap between delivery of D601 and D602 because NBL had to equip itself to construct the engines and transmissions for these three locomotives. By this time the first Swindon-built D800s had entered service and these were the lightweight and more powerful diesel-hydraulic locomotives that the WR really wanted.

D600 and D601 were sold to Woodham Brothers scrapyard in Barry, South Wales. D600 was broken up within a couple of years but D601 remained intact until 1980. Preservation for D601 was denied on the ground that it was too far gone to be restored to operational condition and was not considered to be worth preserving for display only. The last survivor of what had been Class D600 was broken up without mourning in Barry Scrapyard, surrounded by the steam engines it had been intended to replace. D602-D604 were sold to Cashmore's of Newport who broke them up far more quickly than Barry (who concentrated on easily processible wagons before tackling locomotives). Somewhat ironically, as the fleet only lasted eight years in revenue-earning service, D601 actually spent more time in the scrapyard than it did hauling trains on the main line.

No Class D600 Warships survive in preservation, or indeed any main line North British diesel or electric products save for Class 84 25 kV AC electric locomotive no. 84001.

Class details

Modelling 

A 00 gauge kit has been available from Silver Fox models and this was also available as a ready to run model (made to order but now discontinued). In 2019 Kernow Model Rail Centre
released its limited edition OO RTR models of the class - D600 BR blue full yellow end & headcode boxes, D601 BR Green with headcode discs & original louvres, D602 BR blue yellow warning panel & headcode boxes, D602 BR Green with small warning panel & headcode boxes, D603 BR Green with yellow warning panels & headcode discs and D604 BR Green with headcode discs. An additional run is planned for November 2020 availability comprising previously un-released number/livery variations including a weathered green example.

Worsley Works produce a body kit in 'N', 2 mm & 3 mm scales.

References

Further reading

External links

 Photos at Railblue.com

41 1
41 1
NBL locomotives
A1A-A1A locomotives
Railway locomotives introduced in 1958
Scrapped locomotives
Standard gauge locomotives of Great Britain